The 2022 Canada Women's Sevens was rugby sevens tournament for women's national teams that took place between 30 April and 1 May 2022 at Starlight Stadium, Langford, British Columbia, Canada as part of the 2021–22 World Rugby Women's Sevens Series. The defending champions from the 2019 Sevens Series event were New Zealand.

In their third Langford Final appearance, first-time Langford champions Australia beat New Zealand 21–17 in the Final, a rematch of the 2018 and 2019 events. Hosts Canada beat the United States to finish fifth (12–7). It is their third back-to-back fifth placing at home. Ireland finished third, beating France 22–14. It is their first top four placing in Langford, and their first back-to-back top three placing on the World Rugby Women's Sevens Series.

Format
The twelve teams are drawn into three pools of four. Each team will play their other three opponents in their pool once. The top two teams from each pool advance to the Cup bracket, with the two best third-placed teams also advancing. The remaining four teams will compete for a 9th–12th placing.

Teams 
The twelve national women's teams competing in Canada were:
 
  
 
 
 
 
 
 
  
 
 
 
 
  

 Fiji returned to the 2021–22 series after their absence since the Dubai II event.

 Japan was an invited team for the tournament and made their first appearance on the World Series since the 2020 Sydney Sevens.

 Mexico was invited to replace Russia who were banned by World Rugby. Mexico's previous World Series appearance was at the 2018 USA Sevens.

Pool stage
The final pool composition was announced on 10 March.

Pool A

Pool B

Pool C

Ranking of third-placed teams

Knockout stage

9th–12th playoffs

5th–8th playoffs

Cup playoffs

Placings

Source: World Rugby

See also
 2022 Canada Sevens (for men)

References

External links
 Tournament site  

2022
2021–22 World Rugby Women's Sevens Series
2022 in women's rugby union 
2022 rugby sevens competitions
April 2022 sports events in Canada
May 2022 sports events in Canada
Sports competitions in British Columbia